November 2019

See also

References

killings by law enforcement officers
 11